Mount Mignone is a peak in the Cathedral Rocks, Royal Society Range, rising to  between Darkowski Glacier and Bol Glacier in Victoria Land, Antarctica. It was named in 1992 by the Advisory Committee on Antarctic Names in association with Chaplains Tableland after Lieutenant John C. Mignone, U.S. Navy, chaplain with the 1966 winter party at McMurdo Station.

References

Mountains of Victoria Land
Scott Coast